Gratitud (Gratitude) is the third album by Colombian singer-songwriter Fonseca, released by EMI Capitol on May 27, 2008.

Album information
This album mixes tropical rhythms with urban sounds. He cites the influence for had been born in a capital city from Bogotá, Colombia; very far from the sea. The style of the album includes pure vallenato, latin pop and disco in a unique fusion. At the same time, he shows us a great duality in his lyrics, from deep melancholy by that got way and the happiness from the party. His debut on the U.S. Latin Albums charts was in the position number seventy, only least one week. On the U.S. Tropical Albums chart her higher position was the number nine.

Track listing

Credits and personnel
Credits adapted from Gratitud liner notes.

Juan Fernando Fonseca – vocals, composer, guitar
Richard Bravo – drums, drum kit
Wilfran Castillo – composer
David Castro – vocals
Tom Coyne – mastering engineer
Enrique "Kike" Cuao – guache, percussion
Pablo Garcia – photography
Iker Gastaminza – mix engineer

Alejandro Gómez Cáceras – guitar (acoustic)
Lee Levin – drums
Hermides "Taty" Manzano – composer
Boris Milan – mix engineer
Bernardo Ossa – keyboards, palms, programming, recording, sampling
Luis Angel Pastor – bass guitar
Tony Peluso – mix engineer
Alfredo Rosado – wood block, guacharaca

Charts

References

2008 albums
Fonseca (singer) albums
Spanish-language albums
EMI Records albums
EMI Latin albums